Alphomorphus vandykei is a species of beetle in the family Cerambycidae, and the only species in the genus Alphomorphus. It was described by Linsley in 1930.

References

Pogonocherini
Beetles described in 1930
Taxa named by Earle Gorton Linsley